The archaeological site of Menelaion (translit. Menelaeion) is located approximately 5 km from the modern city of Sparta. The geographical structure of this site includes a hill complex (Northern hill, Menelaion, Profitis Ilias and Aetos). The archaic name of the place is mentioned as Therapne.

General context
Fluvial deposits of the valley of Eurotas, mild climate and low hills which protect the area, are forming the general geographical and geological context of the archaeological site which revealed few Middle Helladic findings on the Northern hill and major settlement of the Mycenaean period in the Menelaion.

Ideology

It is considered that Helen appeared initially in Homeric epic poetry, circa 8th century BC. Besides epos, she appears in lyric poetry, in history, in theatrical plays, even in rhetorical exercises. Helen, and her husband Menelaus, belong to a large group of heroes and heroines worshiped throughout Greece. These heroes, heroines and their cults have already been studied in classical archeology and philology and shape the ideology of a particular period of worshipping heroes in ancient Greece.

The earliest literary sources do not use the term hero with the meaning used in subsequent periods, or refer to heroic cult directly. Archaeological evidence indicates that heroic cult existed in some form at the end of the Early Iron Age. Since eighth century BC, there is a small and scattered group of sanctuaries, associated with epic or mythical heroes and identified by inscribed dedications, in most cases after the foundation of worship. Such heroes are Helen and Menelaus to Sparta, Odysseus in Cave of Loizos at beach Polis to Ithaca and Agamemnon at Mycenae.

The heroes of myth and epic performed heroic acts, have founders of cities and sanctuaries, inventors and ancestors of large families. Most of these heroes are male warriors or kings, but the legend and the epic is full of female figures, as is the case in Menelaion. The heroines often usually work in family context, as part of a heroic pair, or as virgins who give their lives to save their city, family, or spouse. Perhaps a curious group of heroes are those who are children or even babies, as in the case of Opheltes infant, who was killed by a snake near a spring at Nemea. The establishment of heroic cult was often the means to resolve a crisis, often related to someone who was killed violently or unjustly. On each occasion the hero becomes the epicenter of worship, weaving a social bond for the survival of the community. Being closer than gods to mankind hero or heroine is important for the support of community members in different aspects of everyday life.

Excavations

Ludwig Ross
On the hill of Menelaion during the 8th century BCE the eponymous heroes, Menelaus and Helen of Troy, were allegedly worshiped, with a possible altar and enclosure. At the end of the 7th and 6th centuries BCE, a temple built with limestone was erected in place. The Menelaeion heroon has been recognized as such at 1833 by Ludwig Ross. Ross excavated the area in the early 19th century, revealing lead votive figurines of the Laconic type.

John Percival Droop, M. S. Thompson, and Alan Wace
In 1909 the British School at Athens conducted with John Percival Droop, M. S. Thompson, and Alan Wace the first systematic excavation of the archaeological site. The excavation revealed a Late Mycenaean structure built with raw brick coated with painted plaster on the eastern peak of the ridge of Menelaeion hill. Further excavations followed, led by Richard MacGillivray Dawkins, then director of the British School of Athens, in the year 1910.

Hector Catling
After 60 years the British School returned to the site and excavations were conducted by Hector Catling. Hector Catling tried to form a chronological sequence between the remnants of the Mycenaean period and the late heroic cult of Menelaos, based on structural changes of the building that Dawkins revealed which divided in three distinct phases:

Mansion 1 - Original building facing south assembling three parallel units. The central unit is considered a megaron. It was built about 1450 BCE and soon destroyed by possible earthquake.
Mansion 2 - was built about 10 meters further from Mansion 1, with a new orientation and reported abandoned during Late Helladic period (LHIIIA1)
Mansion 3 - was inhabited at the end of Late Helladic (LHIIIA1)

Excavations also revealed remains of the Bronze Age in the hills around the Menelaion. In North Hill, north of the ridge of Menelaion, prehistoric settlement has been found in disordered strata, associated with pottery of LH IIIB. On the hill Eagle, south of the ridge of Menelaion, pottery of LH IIB2 has been revealed in a surface stratum. The above-mentioned, in combination  with the building design, led Hector Catling to the view that these palaces were administrative centers and ancestors of large megaroid palaces of Pylos, Mycenae and Tiryns.

Catling's excavation revealed a bronze aryballos with incised boustrophedon inscription, «ΔΕΙΝΙΣ ΑΝΕΘΕΕ [ΕΛΕΝΗΙ, ΣΥΖΥΓΟΝ] ΜΕΝΕΛΑΪ» (Deinis offered to Helen, wife of Menelaus). This inscription confirms Ross's view that the building was heroon dedicated to Menelaus and Helen. A second dedication to Helen has been found in the same trench, a bronze harpax dated to 570 BCE, instrument of unknown use, with the inscription "ΕΛΕΝΙΙ". The next year Catling discovered the first dedication tο Menelaus, in the bottom of a cistern, a blue limestone stele dated from the early 5th century BCE, upon which there was a bronze statuette with the inscription «ΕΥΘΥΚΡΕΝΕΣ ΑΝΕΘΕΚΕ ΤΟΪ ΜΕΝΕΛΑΪ», (Eythycrenes dedicated to Menelaus).

Richard Catling
Richard Catling (Hector Catling's son) continued excavations in Therapne during the 1980s, on a terrace of the south side of Menelaion hill. His site consisted of disturbed strata filled with sub-geometric and early archaic votive offerings. In the same place have been discovered the walls and the floor of a structure dated to late 13th and 12th century BCE. Since some votive offerings have been associated with the remains of the Mycenaean construction, R. Catling expressed the view that they were votive offerings to the hero or heroine of the Bronze Age.

Stratigraphy
As monument, Menelaion presents different stratigraphic and architectural phases:

The first phase, probably late 8th or early 7th century BC, is not linked to a specific architectural edifice, but scattered limestone blocks. Blocks' relative dating depends on their correlation with strata in which relevant votive offerings were uncovered.

During the second phase, probably in the sixth century BC it seems that a small monumental structure has been built made of limestone. Building materials have been found out of archaeological context, either in landfills or preserved in late structure. This Ancient Menelaion survived until the fifth century BC when it was demolished to be replaced with a structure, whose ruins are visible to this day.

The third, classical, phase is connected with the 5th century BC and stratigraphy indicates that the new sanctuary was built upon the ancient edifice, although some researchers believe that Ancient Menelaion was actually recognized as a warehouse during the excavations of 1909.

References

External links

Ancient Greek archaeological sites in Greece
Ancient Laconia